South Africa competed at the Summer Olympic Games for the first time since 1960 at the 1992 Summer Olympics in Barcelona, Spain.  South Africa was permitted to re-join the Olympic Movement after its citizens voted to abolish apartheid. 93 competitors, 68 men and 25 women, took part in 87 events in 19 sports.

Flag, anthem and team logo

As a result of a dispute over what flag and anthem to use, the team participated in these games under a specially designed sporting flag. The flag consisted of a white field charged with a grey diamond, which represented the country's mineral wealth, three cascading bands of blue, orange, and green, which represented the sea, the land, and agriculture respectively, and the Olympic rings.  Team uniforms included the emblem of Olympic Committee of South Africa, which depicted Olympic rings surrounded by olive branches, with the name of the country above. The Olympic Committee of South Africa stated that Beethoven's "Ode to Joy" was picked as the team's anthem at these games to "represent national unity". During the opening ceremony, the flag was carried by marathon runner Jan Tau.

Medalists

Competitors
The following is the list of number of competitors in the Games.

Archery

In South Africa's debut appearance in Olympic archery, the nation was represented by two archers.  Neither advanced past the ranking round.

Men

Women

Athletics

Men
Track & road events

Women
Track & road events

Field events

Badminton

Boxing

Men

Canoeing

Slalom

Sprint
Men

Women

Cycling

Five cyclists, four men and one woman, represented South Africa in 1992.

Road
Men

Women

Track
Time trial

Men's Sprint

Pursuit

Diving

Men

Equestrianism

Show jumping

Fencing

Five fencers, three men and two women, represented South Africa in 1992.

Men

Individual

Women

Individual

Modern pentathlon

One male pentathlete represented South Africa in 1992.

Rowing

Men

Sailing

Men

Open

Shooting

Men

Open

Swimming

Men

Women

Synchronized swimming

Two synchronized swimmers represented South Africa in 1992.

Table tennis

Men

Women

Tennis

Men

Women

Weightlifting

Men

Wrestling

Men's freestyle

References

Nations at the 1992 Summer Olympics
1992
Olympics